Armina Marshall (1895-1991) was a playwright and actress, and the first co-director of New York's Theatre Guild. 

Marshall's New York acting debut was in 1922 in Paul Claudel's The Tidings Brought to Mary. She shifted to producing once she was married, and was the co-author of seven plays, three on Broadway, including the 1933 hit Pursuit of Happiness produced by The Federal Theatre Division of the of Works Progress Administration (written under the pseudonym Isabelle Louden). 

Marshall was instrumental in bringing the Theatre Guild to new audiences, directing "Theater Guild of the Air" for eight years on the radio, as well as "The U.S. Steel Hour" for eight years on television. Marshall and her co-producers won a Tony Award for Best Play in 1958 for the production of Sunrise At Campobello.  She later went on to be a producer at the Theater Guild. The Theater Guild's production of Oklahoma in 1943 was said to have "transformed the face of American musical theater."

Along with her husband, Marshall founded and operated the Westport Country Playhouse in 1930 which did "New York plays" for a Connecticut audience. Marshall and Langer converted an old cow barn into a venue with a Broadway-sized stage. They operated the theater continuously, except for a small break during WWII, until 1959.

Early life and education
Marshall was born in Oklahoma in the narrow border between Oklahoma and Kansas known as Cherokee Outlet. Her father was a sheriff. The family moved to California and she attended the University of California Los Angeles and was a school teacher in Brawley, California.

She married Lawrence Langner in 1925. He died in 1962. The couple had one son and two granddaughters.

References

1895 births
1991 deaths
20th-century American dramatists and playwrights
American theatre directors
Women theatre directors